Frank Joseph Coleman (March 24, 1886 – March 14, 1934) was a United States district judge of the United States District Court for the Southern District of New York.

Education and career

Born in New York City, New York, Coleman received an Artium Baccalaureus degree from City College of New York in 1906 and a Bachelor of Laws from New York Law School in 1909. He was secretary to Justice McLaughlin and Justice Finch of the Supreme Court of New York in 1911, and then became an assistant district attorney of New York County, New York from 1914 to 1916. He served as a private in the United States Army during World War I. He was a Justice of the Municipal Court of New York City from 1918 to 1923. He was Republican leader of 15th assembly district in New York County from 1924 to 1927.

Federal judicial service

Coleman received a recess appointment from President Calvin Coolidge on May 19, 1927, to a seat on the United States District Court for the Southern District of New York vacated by Judge Augustus Noble Hand. He was nominated to the same position by President Coolidge on December 6, 1927. He was confirmed by the United States Senate on December 19, 1927, and received his commission the same day. His service terminated on March 14, 1934, due to his death.

References

Sources
 

1886 births
1934 deaths
City College of New York alumni
New York Law School alumni
Judges of the United States District Court for the Southern District of New York
United States district court judges appointed by Calvin Coolidge
20th-century American judges
United States Army soldiers